Vie is a district of Oradea, a city in Romania.

VIE may also refer to:

Vie (river), a river in western France
Vie (cards), a term in card games
Vienna International Airport (VIE), as coded according to the IATA standard
Vietnamese language (vie), as coded according to ISO 639-2 standard
Vacuum insulated evaporator, cryogenic storage pressure vessel
Vance Integral Edition, the complete works of author Jack Vance
Variable interest entity, a type of legal entity in finance and investment
Virgin Interactive Entertainment, videogame publisher

See also

Lavie (disambiguation)
La vie (disambiguation)
C'est la vie (disambiguation)